Reform of local government in Northern Ireland saw the replacement of the twenty-six districts created in 1973 with a smaller number of "super districts". The review process began in 2002, with proposals for either seven or eleven districts made before it was suspended in 2010. On 12 March 2012, the Northern Ireland Executive published its programme for government, which included a commitment to reduce the number of councils in Northern Ireland to 11. The first elections to these new councils were on 22 May 2014.

Background
Compared to unitary authorities in England, the current Northern Ireland districts have small populations, with an average population of about 65,000. In June 2002 the Northern Ireland Executive established a Review of Public Administration to review the arrangements for the accountability, development, administration and delivery of public services. Among its recommendations were a reduction in the number of districts.

Situation before reform process

There were 26 districts, each with a district council, which were created in 1973.

First scheme: seven districts
On 22 November 2005 Peter Hain, the Secretary of State for Northern Ireland, announced proposals to reduce the number of councils to seven.

The new authorities were to have a number of new powers in such areas as planning, local roads functions, regeneration, and fostering community relations, which were to be transferred from the existing joint boards and other bodies, that are much closer in size to the proposed local authorities.  Legislation was to be introduced to prevent serving councillors also being Members of the Northern Ireland Assembly (the so-called dual mandate that was also recently abolished in the Republic of Ireland).

Initial reaction from Northern Ireland's political parties, except for Sinn Féin, was hostile, emphasising the reduction in local representation and frequently expressing a fear that the region would be carved up on sectarian lines. Three councils would have had substantial Ulster Protestant majorities, while three would have had Catholic majorities, with Belfast very nearly equally balanced.  Former Secretary of State for Northern Ireland, Paul Murphy, criticised the proposals as too severe.

The Local Government (Boundaries) (Northern Ireland) Order 2006 was made on 9 May 2006 providing for the appointment of a Local Government Boundaries Commissioner to recommend the boundaries and names of the seven districts and then to divide the districts into wards. Dick Mackenzie was appointed as Commissioner on 1 July 2006.

The commissioner announced his provisional recommendations on 7 November 2006:

An eight-week public consultation period on the proposals, during which members of the public could make written submissions, ended on 5 January 2007. Public hearings conducted by assistant commissioners were held in January and February 2007. The assistant commissioners issued reports on the results of the hearings, and the commissioner published revised recommendations on 30 March 2007. There were only minor changes to the original scheme.  The most controversial aspects of the proposed reform were the names of the new districts.

Second scheme: eleven districts
In June 2007, following the restoration of a power-sharing Executive, it became clear that the plan to create seven "super-councils" was to be reviewed, if not abandoned. The following month, in July 2007, Arlene Foster, Minister for the Environment in the Executive, announced a review. A committee was established to report by the end of 2007.

On 13 March 2008 the Executive agreed on proposals brought forward by Environment Minister Arlene Foster to create 11 new councils instead of the original 7. The 2 UUP ministers voted against the proposals as their party favoured 15 councils, however the proposals passed by 7 votes to 2.

The areas of the eleven proposed councils were to consist of combinations of existing districts as follows:

On 25 April 2008, Shaun Woodward, Secretary of State for Northern Ireland announced that the scheduled 2009 district council elections were to be postponed until the introduction of the eleven new councils in 2011. The names of the new districts were announced on 17 September 2008 with revised names recommended on 27 February 2009.

A legal framework for the creation of the 11 new District Councils was put into place with the passing of the Local Government (Boundaries) Act (Northern Ireland) 2008 by the Northern Ireland Assembly in May 2008. This act repeals the Local Government (Boundaries) Act (Northern Ireland) 1971 which established the 26 districts used in 1973–2015.

Suspension
In May 2010 it emerged that the process of bringing the new authorities into existence was likely to be delayed, due to the failure of members of the Northern Ireland Executive to agree on boundaries for district electoral areas. The main issue was the inclusion of Dunmurry within the city boundaries of Belfast rather than Lisburn City and Castlereagh. Edwin Poots, Northern Ireland Minister of the Environment, opposed the extension of Belfast, while Sinn Féin members of the executive favoured it. The Northern Ireland Office made it clear that unless the dispute was speedily resolved, elections due in May 2011 would be to the existing 26 district councils.

A decision to delay changes until 2015 was expected to be announced on 13 May 2010, but was postponed, reportedly due to disagreements between Poots and Sammy Wilson, the Executive's Minister of Finance and Personnel. On 15 June 2010, the proposed reforms were abandoned following the failure of the Northern Ireland Executive to obtain cross community support. Ministers from the Social Democratic and Labour Party (SDLP), Sinn Féin and Alliance Party voted in favour of the reforms, Democratic Unionist Party ministers voted against and Ulster Unionist Party ministers abstained. Accordingly, elections to the existing 26 councils took place in 2011.

The president of the Northern Ireland Local Government Association noted that "Local Government Reform will not take place at all, with no notification that it is simply put off to 2015 which was one of the options the Minister was to put forward to the Executive", and angrily denounced the decision as "clearly not acceptable on any level".

Programme for Government 2011–2015
After the 2011 elections, the new executive drew up a programme for government for the assembly's four-year term, which was published on 12 March 2012. Under "Priority 5: Delivering High Quality and Efficient Public Services", one commitment was "Establish the new 11 council model for Local Government by 2015", under the responsibility of the Department of the Environment. The milestones laid down for this are: 
2012/13Progress legislation (to include Local Government Reorganisation Act) and a programme structure necessary to manage change
2013/14Arrangements in place for the shadow Councils. Deliver Year 2 of implementation programme
2014/15Arrangements in place for the transfer of powers to councils

A draft Local Government (Boundaries) Order (Northern Ireland) 2012 was published, specifying eleven districts with names and boundaries similar to the previous proposal.
On 12 June 2012, the Northern Ireland Assembly approved the draft Order by 59 votes to 26; the DUP, Sinn Féin, and the Alliance Party voted for, while the Ulster Unionist Party and the SDLP voted against. The Order (2012 No. 421) was made on 30 November 2012.

See also
2014 Northern Ireland local elections

References

Sources

Citations

 
History of local government in Northern Ireland
2015 in Northern Ireland
Political history of Northern Ireland